Bantry is a city in McHenry County, North Dakota, United States. The population was 6 at the 2020 census. It is part of the Minot Micropolitan Statistical Area. Bantry was founded in 1905. Bantry was founded by Irish settlers. The City of Bantry dissolved in November 2019 and the area reverted to Bantry township.

Geography
Bantry is located at  (48.497822, -100.609644).

Demographics

2010 census
As of the census of 2010, there were 14 people, 7 households, and 4 families residing in the city. The racial makeup of the city was 100.0% White.

There were 7 households, of which 28.6% had children under the age of 18 living with them, 42.9% were married couples living together, 14.3% had a female householder with no husband present, and 42.9% were non-families. 28.6% of all households were made up of individuals. The average household size was 2.00 and the average family size was 2.50.

The median age in the city was 37.5 years. 21.4% of residents were under the age of 18; 7% were between the ages of 18 and 24; 35.7% were from 25 to 44; 21.4% were from 45 to 64; and 14.3% were 65 years of age or older. The gender makeup of the city was 57.1% male and 42.9% female.

2000 census
As of the census of 2000, there were 19 people, 11 households, and 4 families residing in the city. The population density was 115.6 people per square mile (45.8/km2). There were 11 housing units at an average density of 66.9 per square mile (26.5/km2). The racial makeup of the city was 100.00% White.

There were 11 households, out of which 9.1% had children under the age of 18 living with them, 9.1% were married couples living together, 27.3% had a female householder with no husband present, and 63.6% were non-families. 54.5% of all households were made up of individuals, and 9.1% had someone living alone who was 65 years of age or older. The average household size was 1.73 and the average family size was 2.50.

In the city, the population was spread out, with 15.8% under the age of 18, 21.1% from 18 to 24, 21.1% from 25 to 44, 31.6% from 45 to 64, and 10.5% who were 65 years of age or older. The median age was 36 years. For every 100 females, there were 280.0 males. For every 100 females age 18 and over, there were 220.0 males.

The median income for a household in the city was $13,750, and the median income for a family was $19,167. Males had a median income of $23,750 versus $11,250 for females. The per capita income for the city was $12,696. There are 25.0% of families living below the poverty line and 21.4% of the population, including no under eighteens and 100.0% of those over 64.

Notable person
Vernon Robert Pearson, Chief Justice of the Washington Supreme Court

Climate
This climatic region is typified by large seasonal temperature differences, with warm to hot (and often humid) summers and cold (sometimes severely cold) winters.  According to the Köppen Climate Classification system, Bantry has a humid continental climate, abbreviated "Dfb" on climate maps.

References

Cities in North Dakota
Cities in McHenry County, North Dakota
Populated places established in 1905
1905 establishments in North Dakota
Minot, North Dakota micropolitan area
Populated places disestablished in 2019